Aechmea caudata is a species in the genus Aechmea. This species is native to southeastern Brazil from Espírito Santo to Rio Grande do Sul.

Cultivars
Cultivars include:

 Aechmea 'Ann Vincent'
 Aechmea 'Blotches'
 Aechmea 'Blue Tip(s)'
 Aechmea 'Brett Terrace'
 Aechmea 'Fascidata'
 Aechmea 'Fire Chief'
 Aechmea 'Fireworks'
 Aechmea 'Gotha'
 Aechmea 'Mary Brett'
 Aechmea 'Melanocrater'
 Aechmea 'Pioneer'
 Aechmea 'Roman Candle'
 Aechmea 'Sao Paulo'
 Aechmea 'Sarah'
 Aechmea 'Scarlet Gem'

References

External links

caudata
Flora of Brazil
Plants described in 1891